Eugene Roshal (born 1972) is a Russian software engineer.

Career 
Roshal is best known as the developer of:

 RAR file format (1993)
 WinRAR file archiver (1995)
 FAR file manager (1996)

The RAR compression algorithm is officially owned by his elder brother Alexander, because Eugene Roshal has "no time to concern himself with software development and copyright-related issues at the same time."

References

Further reading
 Biography and product timeline based on The Compression Project web page: Russian language interview with E. Roshal accessed 12 January 2010 (and verified by personal email exchange with him in 2011).

1972 births
Living people
People from Chelyabinsk
Russian Jews
Russian computer programmers
21st-century Russian inventors
South Ural State University alumni